Senapati Mahal is a palace built by Senapati, son of Jagat Rai and grandson of Chhatrasal in 1700 in Kulpahar on a hillock. The palace is now a protected monument.

See also
 Senapati fortress

Bundelkhand
Tourist attractions in Mahoba district
Palaces in Uttar Pradesh